Landry Bender (born August 3, 2000) is an American actress. She is known for playing the role of Cleo Bernstein in the Disney XD series Crash & Bernstein, and playing Blithe Pedulla in the 2011 film The Sitter. Bender played one of the lead roles, Cyd, in the 2015–2016 Disney Channel sitcom Best Friends Whenever. From 2017 to 2020, she played Rocki in the Netflix sitcom Fuller House.

Early life 
Bender was born in Chicago, Illinois. She is the daughter of sportscaster Trey Bender. She moved to Phoenix when she was two. She began taking acting classes at Desert Stages Theatre by age 5. She attended and graduated from Oak Park Independent School.

Filmography

References

External links 
 
 

American child actresses
American film actresses
American television actresses
2000 births
Living people
Actresses from Chicago
21st-century American actresses